Robert Barr (born 1978) is a Scottish field hockey player who played for the Scotland men's national field hockey team.  He plays his club hockey for Grange Hockey Club in Edinburgh.  Barr has also represented Scottish Universities and Edinburgh University Hockey Club. Barr has been captain of Grange for several seasons.

Barr has represented Scotland in South Africa, Italy, Pakistan, Russia and Switzerland.  During the 2009 season he was selected to represent the Highland Jaguars in the Great Britain Super League.

With his club side, Grange, he played in the 2007–08 and 2012–13 Euro Hockey Leagues.  Grange were runners-up to Dinamo Elektrostal in the final of the 2009–10 EuroHockey Club Trophy. 

Barr was a member of the Grange squad that won the 2015 Scottish Cup, the first time Grange had won the Cup in successive years. Grange defeated Edinburgh University 5-1 in the final.

In 2008, Barr and fellow Scotland International, Colin Clarke, set up Skoolsports, dedicated to introducing hockey to young children through courses and clinics, all over the UK.

References

External links
Robert Barr at Skoolsports

1978 births
Living people
People educated at Strathallan School
Alumni of the University of Edinburgh
Scottish male field hockey players
Place of birth missing (living people)
Scotland men's international field hockey players